Every Second Counts is an American comedy television game show that premiered in syndication on September 17, 1984. The series lasted one season and aired until September 1985. Every Second Counts was a production of Group W Productions and Charles Colarusso Productions.

Bill Rafferty hosted Every Second Counts with Johnny Gilbert announcing. Actress Debbie Bartlett served as the show's hostess for the first half of the season, then left the series in early 1985 to join the cast of The Love Boat and was replaced by Susie Carr.

Every Second Counts lasted only one season in America. Rafferty stated in an interview that certain Westinghouse/Group W executives apparently did not like the show; in addition, some cities, including the country's top-rated TV market of New York City, did not air it at all. The format proved far more successful in the United Kingdom, airing from 1986 to 1993.

Gameplay
Three married couples competed in a game of answering questions, with the goal of earning seconds that would later be used in the bonus round at the end of the show.

Main game
The game was played in two rounds, with the wives playing the first round and the husbands the second.

In each round, three sets of questions were played. Each of these questions were either true/false or this-or-that, and in the latter case the players were presented with two humorous answer choices before the first question was asked. (E.g., "chew it" if an item was a brand of chewing tobacco, or "screw it" if it was a type of screwdriver.) Each set consisted of nine questions, asked in order from left to right. Answering correctly added seconds to the couple's total, with incorrect answers locking them out for the remainder of the set. Each set ended once either all nine questions were asked or all three couples had locked themselves out, whichever came first. Questions were worth two seconds each in the first round, and four in the second. The couple with the most seconds at the end of two rounds won the game and advanced to the bonus round.

During the last question set in the second round it was possible for the leading couple to win the game before the set was complete, provided both of the other couples were locked out first. If this happened, Rafferty continued to ask them questions until they completed the set or gave a wrong answer.

If the game ended in a tie, one final question set was played between the tied couples; as soon as one couple missed a question, their opponents won the game.

Bonus round
Using their accumulated time, the winning couple played the bonus round for a series of prizes of increasing value. Four levels of prizes were available, each requiring a different number of correct answers. The prize on the fourth level was always a car. All questions in this round had three answer choices.

At the beginning of each level, the couple chose one of two categories and the husband and wife alternated answering the questions. If they gave the required number of correct answers before time ran out, the clock was stopped and they advanced to the next level. Four answers were needed to clear the first level, five for the second, six for the third, and seven for the fourth.

If the couple cleared the fourth level before time ran out, they won the car and all the prizes at the lower three levels. Otherwise, they won the prizes for the levels they had cleared, plus $100 for each correct answer given on the current level when time ran out.

Every Second Counts did not feature returning champions.

International versions

References

External links
  (1984–1985 US version)
  (1986–1993 UK version)
  (1990–1991 Spain version)
 clip from Los Segundos Cuentan
 (1987–1989 New Zealand version)

1984 American television series debuts
1985 American television series endings
First-run syndicated television programs in the United States
1980s American comedy game shows
Television series by CBS Studios